is a fan disc meta-sequel to dojin visual novel game, Tsukihime, released on August 13, 2001, by Type-Moon. On April 18, 2002, Inside-Cap released an officially licensed program for Windows 98/Me/2000/XP that allowed customers to convert their PC copy of Kagetsu Tohya into a Gameboy Advance rom for on the go playing; the program was distributed via CD-ROM through retail and online shops.

Gameplay

Kagetsu Tohya consists of Twilight Glass Moon, Fairy Tale Princess, a main scenario with many branches, Ten Nights of Dream several short stories that are unlocked one after another after certain related events in the main story have been read and Summer Festival a short scenario that is unlocked after the completing the main story. The gameplay is much more dynamic than in Tsukihime. Rather than being linear, the game's narrative is focused on a single looping day which the player repeats multiple times after completing one "day" in Shiki's dream, your data is automatically saved. The player is given a large number of choices to make, which cause the story to branch out, and reaching certain branches unlocks more choices.

Plot
 
One year after the events of Tsukihime, half of July 2001, protagonist Shiki Tohno is a victim of an accident. After this accident, Shiki finds himself in a dream where he repeats the same day over and over. Eventually, he discovers that he must find Arcueid's familiar Len, the creator of the dream, if he wishes to escape.

Characters

 
Characters from Tsukihime, such as Shiki, Akiha, Ciel, Arcueid, Kohaku, Hisui, return in Kagetsu Tohya.

The characters Len; Shiki’s alternate self using his birth name, Shiki Nanaya; Kouma Kishima are introduced in this game, then re-appear as playable characters in the Melty Blood fighting game series, and appeared in the manga adaption of Tsukihime, whereas Kouma briefly appeared in its flashback, while Len appeared as a silhouette. Another character who debuted in this game, Gouto Saiki initially debuted as a flashback character related to Nanaya family prior to being re-introduced prominently in Tsukihime remake timeline as of Tsukihime -a piece of blue glass moon-.

References

External links
 Kagetsu Tohya at Type-Moon's official website. 
 
 

 

2001 video games
Bishōjo games
Doujin video games
Fangames
Fantasy video games
Eroge
Japan-exclusive video games
NScripter games
Tsukihime
Type-Moon
Video games about vampires
Video games about time loops
Video games with time manipulation
Visual novels
Windows games
Windows-only games
Video games developed in Japan